Olive Price (1903–1991) was an American writer of books and plays for children.

Born September 21 in Pittsburgh, Pennsylvania, to Harry and Lydia (Barchfeld) Price, she attended the University of Pittsburgh in 1922–23, then worked as an advertising copywriter for department stores in Pittsburgh until 1928, then began her writing career. She married R. M. Cherryholmes on June 30, 1927. She was also known as Olive M. Price, and wrote under the pseudonyms of Anne Cherryholmes and Barbara West.

Works
For children:

 A Donkey for the King, McGraw, 1945.
 Miracle by the Sea, McGraw, 1947.
 Three Golden Rivers (Catholic Book Club selection), Bobbs-Merrill, 1948.
 The Valley of the Dragon, Bobbs-Merrill, 1951.
 The Story of Marco Polo (selection of Parents' Magazine Book Club, People's Book Club, Boy's Club of America Book Club, and Sear's Book Club), Grosset, 1953.
 The Story of Clara Barton (Boy's Club of America Book Club selection), Grosset, 1954.
 The Glass Mountain, Washburn, 1954.
 The Blue Harbor, Washburn, 1956.
 Snifty, Westminster, 1957.
 The Golden Wheel, Westminster, 1958.
 River Boy, Westminster, 1959.
 Reindeer Island, Westminster, 1960.
 The Phantom Reindeer, Coward, 1961.
 Mystery of the Sunken City, Westminster, 1962.
 The Donkey with Diamond Ears, Coward, 1962.
 The Boy with One Shoe, Coward, 1963.
 The Island of the Silver Spoon (Under pseudonym Anne Cherryholmes), Coward, 1963.
 The Island of the Voyageurs (Under pseudonym Anne Cherryholmes), Coward, 1964.
 The Dog That Watched the Mountain, Coward, 1967.
 Kim Walk-In-My-Shoes (Books for Brotherhood Book Club selection), Coward, 1968.
 Rosa Bonheur: Painter of Animals, Garrad, 1972.

Picture books adapted for children from literary classics:
 Alfred Ollivant, Bob, Son of Battle, 1960.
 Jack London, Call of the Wild, 1961.
 Margaret Sydney, Five Little Peppers and How They Grew, 1963.

Books of plays:
 Short Plays from American History and Literature for Classroom Use: Grade Schools, Samuel French, Volume I, 1925, Volume II, 1928, Volume III, 1929, Volume IV, 1935; Plays for Schools, Baker's Plays, 1927.
 American History in Masque and Wig for Classroom Use, Baker's Plays, 1931.
 Plays for Young Children, U.S. Bicentennial Commission to Celebrate the Bicentennial of George Washington's Birthday, 1932.
 Plays of Far Places, Baker's Plays, 1936.
 Debutante Plays for Girls Twelve to Twenty, Samuel French, 1936.
 Plays of Belles and Beaux: Seven Short Plays for High School and Junior High, Samuel French, 1937.

Plays published singly:
 Lantern Light, Samuel French, 1925.
 The Gateway of Tomorrow (an Americanization play), Scott Mitchell, 1929.
 Washington Marches On, U.S. Bicentennial Celebration, 1931.
 Angelica, Inc., Samuel French, 1937.
 The Young May Moon, Samuel French, 1939.
 Star Eternal, Dramatists Play Service, 1939.
 Holiday Hill, Row, Peterson, 1940.
 When the Bough Breaks, Eldridge Entertainment House, 1940.
 Freshman Bill, Eldridge Entertainment House, 1941.
 Announcing Antonia, Samuel French, 1941.
 Ask for the Moon, Row, Peterson, 1942.
 Sub-Deb Sue, Dramatists Play Service, 1942.
 Family Tree, Row, Peterson, 1943.
 (Under pseudonym Barbara West) Belles in Waiting, Row, Peterson, 1943.
 Out of the Mist, Eldridge Entertainment House, 1943.
 Magic on Main Street (for women), Row, Peterson, 1945.
 Stage Struck, Row, Peterson, 1946.
 Rummage Sale (for women), Row, Peterson, 1946.
 Sparkling Sixteen, Northwestern Press, 1947.

Sources
Contemporary Authors Online. The Gale Group, 2002. PEN (Permanent Entry Number):  0000079845.

1903 births
1991 deaths
Writers from Pittsburgh